The 1967–68 season was the 88th season of competitive football in England. Defending First Division champions, Manchester United, became the first English team to win the European Cup, while the First Division title went to their cross city rivals City. West Bromwich Albion lifted the FA Cup this season, for the fifth time in their history. Leeds United won their first two major trophies when they lifted the Inter-Cities Fairs Cup and Football League Cup at the expense of an Arsenal side who had not played at Wembley for 16 years.

Honours

Notes. Number in parentheses is the times that club has won that honour.

FA Cup

The 1968 FA Cup Final was won by West Bromwich Albion who beat Everton 1–0 in extra time with a goal from Jeff Astle. It was Albion's fifth FA Cup success.

League Cup

Leeds United beat Arsenal 1–0 in the final of the League Cup to win the competition for the first time.

Football League

First Division
For the first time since 1937, Manchester City won the First Division, finishing two points clear of their local rivals Manchester United. Fulham finished in last place and were relegated along with Sheffield United. Coventry City, under Noel Cantwell escaped relegation by one point and would go on to stay in the top division until their eventual relegation at the end of the 2000–01 season.

Manchester United's George Best and Ron Davies of Southampton finished as Division One's joint-top scorers with 28 goals apiece. Best was awarded the Football Writers' Association Footballer of the Year, as well as the European Footballer of the Year award.

Second Division
Bill McGarry's Ipswich Town team won the Second Division by one point from Queens Park Rangers, with both teams promoted. Blackpool finished third on goal average and so missed out. Rotherham United and bottom club Plymouth Argyle were both relegated to the Third Division.

Third Division
In the Third Division, Oxford United won their first divisional title and achieved what was then their highest ever finish in only their sixth season as a league club. Runners-up Bury joined them in promotion. Grimsby Town, Colchester United and Scunthorpe United were relegated, although the biggest story concerned bottom placed Peterborough United who were docked 19 points for offering irregular bonuses to their players and so finished bottom. Had the points been restored the club would have finished in the top half. As a result of the ruling Mansfield Town escaped relegation.

Fourth Division
Luton Town won the Fourth Division and were promoted along with Barnsley, Hartlepools United and Crewe Alexandra. The bottom four clubs were forced to apply to re-election to the Football League as per usual; more unusually however, Port Vale were also made to apply for re-election, as a result of financial irregularities. In the end, all five clubs were re-elected.

Top goalscorers

First Division
George Best (Manchester United) and Ron Davies (Southampton) – 28 goals

Second Division
John Hickton (Middlesbrough) – 24 goals

Third Division
Don Rogers (Swindon Town) – 25 goals

Fourth Division
Les Massie (Halifax Town) and Roy Chapman (Port Vale) – 25 goals

European football
Manchester United became the first English team to win the European Cup when they beat Benfica 4–1 after extra time at Wembley Stadium with goals from Bobby Charlton (2), George Best and Brian Kidd. Manager Matt Busby was knighted that year for his achievements. A double triumph was secured by Leeds United when they won the Inter Cities Fairs Cup by beating Ferencváros 1–0 on aggregate in the final, which was not completed until September 1968.

Events of the season
 12 August 1967 – Tottenham Hotspur's goalkeeper Pat Jennings scores in the Charity Shield as Spurs draw 3–3 with Manchester United at Old Trafford.
 19 August 1967 – The League champions Manchester United open the First Division season with a 3–1 defeat to Everton. Liverpool and Manchester City draw 0–0, and Coventry City's first match in the First Division ends in a 2–1 loss at Burnley.
 26 August 1967 – Sheffield Wednesday are the early leaders of the First Division, the only team with three wins out of three. Defeats for Manchester City and Leeds United leave both teams without a League win from their first three matches.
 2 September 1967 – Southampton thrash Chelsea 6–2 at Stamford Bridge. Burnley beat Tottenham Hotspur 5–1, and Sheffield Wednesday win the Steel City derby to top the League table.
 16 September 1967 – Manchester City's fifth consecutive League win, 5–2 against Sheffield United sees them join Liverpool, Arsenal, Sheffield Wednesday and Tottenham Hotspur at the top of the League table.
 7 October 1967 – After scoring just ten goals in their first nine League matches, Leeds United hammer Chelsea 7–0 at Elland Road. Liverpool lose at Leicester City, allowing Sheffield Wednesday to return to the top of the table.
 28 October 1967 – Liverpool beat Sheffield Wednesday 1–0 at Anfield to lead the First Division at the end of October.
 11 November 1967 – Manchester United beat Liverpool 2–1 and replace them at the top of the League table. Manchester City are third after beating Leicester City 6–0. West Bromwich Albion thrash Burnley 8–1.
 9 December 1967 – Manchester City move to within a point of the leaders Manchester United by beating Tottenham Hotspur 4–1 on a snow-covered pitch at Maine Road with goals from Colin Bell, Mike Summerbee, Tony Coleman and Neil Young.
 30 December 1967 – Manchester United end the calendar year top of the First Division, three points ahead of Liverpool and four ahead of Leeds United. Manchester City drop to fourth after losing to West Bromwich Albion for the second time in four days. Coventry City and Fulham occupy the relegation places.
 13 January 1968 – Leeds United move into second place in the League by beating Southampton 5–0, having beaten Fulham by the same score the previous week.
 17 February 1968 – Manchester United lose in the League for the first time since October when they go down 2–1 at Burnley, but they remain a point clear of Leeds United at the top of the table.
 2 March 1968 – Leeds United beat Arsenal 1–0 in the League Cup final at Wembley.
 16 March 1968 – Manchester United's defeat at Coventry allows Manchester City to move to the top of the table on goal average by beating bottom-of-the-table Fulham 5–1. They lead Leeds United by one point, with Liverpool a further point behind.
 27 March 1968 – Manchester City win the League derby at Old Trafford, leaving both teams locked together with Leeds United at the top of the table with nine games remaining.
 6 April 1968 – Manchester United are beaten 2–1 at home by Liverpool, their second consecutive home defeat in the League. Manchester City lose at Leicester, allowing Leeds United to move to the top of the table with a 3–0 win over relegation-threatened Sheffield United.
 29 April 1968 – Manchester City move back to the top of the First Division by beating Everton 2–0 while Manchester United are thrashed 6–3 by free-scoring West Bromwich Albion at The Hawthorns.
 1 May 1968 – Fulham lose 2–0 at home to Stoke City and are relegated from the First Division.
 4 May 1968 – Liverpool keep their title hopes alive by beating Leeds United 2–1. Both teams trail the two Manchester clubs by three points, with City remaining ahead of United on goal average.
 7 May 1968 – Leeds United's third consecutive League defeat, 4–3 at Arsenal, eliminates them from the Championship race. Manchester City, Manchester United and Liverpool remain in contention going into the final Saturday.
 11 May 1968 – Manchester City win the First Division title for the first time since 1937 with a 4–3 away win against Newcastle United. Manchester United surrender their title by losing 2–1 at home to Sunderland. Sheffield United take the second relegation spot after losing at home to Chelsea.
 15 May 1968 – Leeds United reach the final of the Fairs Cup by beating Scottish side Dundee. Eddie Gray scores the decisive goal in the second leg to secure a 2–1 aggregate victory.
 18 May 1968 – West Bromwich Albion beat Everton 1–0 after extra time in the FA Cup final to win the trophy for the fifth time.
 29 May 1968 – Manchester United defeat Benfica 4–1 after extra time in the European Cup final at Wembley. Bobby Charlton scores twice and George Best and Brian Kidd add further goals as the Red Devils become the first English team to win the competition.

Deaths
 7 March 1968 – Grenville Hair, 36, former Leeds United left back and current Bradford City manager, from heart attack during training.

References